David Young is a British television producer.  In 2001, as the Head of Light Entertainment for the BBC, he created the television programme Weakest Link.

Biography
Young began his career as a runner for Hat Trick Productions in the early 1990s after graduating from Bristol University with a BA Honours degree in Drama. He later secured a development deal with Hat Trick where he went on to create and produce Whatever You Want for BBC One. Following a brief spell creating and producing his own formats at Endemol UK, he became the youngest ever Head of Light Entertainment at BBC Television in 1999. At the BBC, Young and his team created a string of hits including: Friends Like These, Dog Eat Dog, Jet Set and The Weakest Link. In 2001 Young quit the BBC to set up 12 Yard with his former employers Hat Trick. Six years later, Young sold the business to ITV plc for £35 million in December 2007.

Since joining ITV Studios the company continue to prosper. In early 2009 they signed a £15 million output deal with the BBC after agreeing to produce their programmes Eggheads, In It To Win It, and Who Dares Wins from Glasgow, Scotland. The latest 12 Yard success is Coach Trip, the reality game show, which relaunched on Channel Four in April 2009. The success of Coach Trip led to a Channel Four recommissioning a 50 episode run. Coach Trip is the latest 12 Yard format to be launched around the world.

Young launched Hindsight Productions.

Credits

United Kingdom
 The Weakest Link
 Dog Eat Dog
 Friends Like These
 Jet Set
 Whatever You Want
 Nothing but the Truth
 Foot in the Door
 Playing for Time
 In It to Win It
 Eggheads
 Who Dares Wins (aka The Rich List/Money List)
 Without Prejudice?
 Coach Trip
 The Great British Village Show
 The Colour of Money

United States
 The Weakest Link (NBC)
 Dog Eat Dog (NBC)
 The Benefactor (ABC)
 The Rich List (Fox)
 Without Prejudice? (GSN)
 The Money List (GSN)

References

External links

English television producers
Living people
Year of birth missing (living people)